Operation Snatch is a 1962 British comedy film starring Terry-Thomas and George Sanders and directed by Robert Day.

Plot

The story takes place in Gibraltar, and is based on a local legend: if the resident Barbary apes were ever to leave, the British would lose Gibraltar. This wartime comedy has Terry-Thomas as the keeper of the apes. When one of the apes goes missing, he is required to go behind enemy lines to capture another one, or be personally responsible for the loss of Gibraltar.

Cast
 Terry-Thomas as Lieutenant Wigg
 George Sanders as Major Hobson
 Lionel Jeffries as Evans
 Jocelyn Lane as Bianca Tabori
 Mark Eden as Mosquito Pilot 
 Mario Fabrizi as Tall Man 
 John Gabriel as Major Frink 
 Gerard Heinz as Colonel Waldock 
 Bernard Hunter as Captain Baker 
 Dinsdale Landen as Captain Wellington 
 Howard H. Lang as P.T. Sergeant 
 Angus Lennie as Vic 
 Jeremy Lloyd as Captain James 
 John Meillon as Medical Officer 
 Warren Mitchell as Contact Man 
 Lee Montague as Miklos Tabori 
 Nyree Dawn Porter as W.R.A.C. Officer 
 John Scott as Lieutenant General Hepworth 
 Mark Singleton as Prime Minister's Secretary 
 Graham Stark as Soldier 
 Michael Trubshawe as Colonel Marston 
 James Villiers as Lieutenant Keen 
 Ian Whittaker as Dyson

See also
 Barbary macaques in Gibraltar#Legend

References

External links
 
 

1962 films
1962 comedy films
British comedy films
British black-and-white films
Films shot at Associated British Studios
British World War II films
Films directed by Robert Day
Films shot in Gibraltar
Military humor in film
1960s English-language films
1960s British films